Boom Crash Opera are an Australian rock band formed in 1985. The band have released six studio albums, six compilation albums, one EP, one box set and twenty singles.

Albums

Studio albums

Compilation albums

Box Set

Extended plays

Singles

References

Discographies of Australian artists
Rock music group discographies